Wan is the Mandarin pinyin and Wade–Giles romanization of the Chinese surname written  in simplified Chinese and  in traditional Chinese. It is romanized as Man in Cantonese. It is listed 162nd in the Song dynasty classic text Hundred Family Surnames. As of 2008, it is the 88th most common surname in China, shared by 2.4 million people. The province with the most people having the surname is Anhui. In 2011, of the top 30 cities in China it was the only the top ten surnames of Nanchang, where it is the fourth-most common name.

Notable people
 Wan Yu (died 272), Chancellor of Eastern Wu
 Consort Wan (1428–1487), consort of the Chenghua Emperor of the Ming dynasty
 Wan Quan (1495–1585), Ming dynasty paediatrician
 Wan Hu (16th century), legendary "rocket scientist"
 Wan Fulin (1880–1951), military governor of Heilongjiang province
 The Wan brothers, founders of the Chinese animation industry
 Wan Laiming (1900–1997)
 Wan Guchan (1900–1995)
 Wan Chaochen (1906–1992)
 Wan Dihuan (*1907)
 Wan Laisheng (1903–1995), martial artist
 Wan Yi (万毅; 1907–1997), general and politician
 Wan Jiabao, pen name Cao Yu (1910–1996), influential playwright
 Wan Xiaotang (1916–1966), Communist Party chief of Tianjin
 Wan Li (1916–2015), Vice Premier, Politburo member
 Wan Haifeng (born 1920), general
 Wan Shaofen (born 1930), former Communist Party chief of Jiangxi province, the first female provincial party chief
 Wan Long (born 1940), billionaire businessman, CEO of WH Group
 Wan Xueyuan (born 1941), former Governor of Zhejiang province
 Wan Jifei (born 1948), politician, a son of Wan Li
 Wan Jen (born 1950), Taiwanese filmmaker
 Wan Gang (born 1952), Ministry of Science and Technology of China
 Wan Exiang (born 1956), Vice President of the Supreme People's Court of China
 Alex Man (Wan Ziliang; born 1957), Hong Kong actor
 Wan Guanghua (born 1961), economist
 Wan Yanhai (born 1963), AIDS activist
 Joey Meng (Wan Qiwen; born 1970), Hong Kong actress
 Wan Xiaoli (born 1971), singer
 Wan Cheng (born 1985), football player
 Wan Houliang (born 1986), football player
 Wan Peng (born 1996), actress

References

Chinese-language surnames
Individual Chinese surnames
Surnames of Malaysian origin